Sonny Bosz (born 17 July 1990 in France) is a Dutch retired footballer.

Career

Bosz started his career with Go Ahead Eagles.
In 2014, he signed for AGOVV Apeldoorn.

References

Dutch footballers
Living people
1990 births
Association football defenders
Association football midfielders
FC Lienden players
Go Ahead Eagles players